Merseybeast is the title of Ian McNabb's third solo album after disbanding The Icicle Works.  It is also the title of the first song on the album.   The name is a play on the idea of the "Mersey Beat", a 1960s musical genre and movement. Merseybeast is also the title of Ian McNabb's autobiography, published in 2008. A second CD entitled North West Coast was also released in limited quantities. The album peaked at No. 30 on the official UK charts.

Critical reception
Roch Parisien qualified Merseybeast as an "album... to savor" Giving it a rating of 4.5 stars out of five.

Track listings
All tracks composed by Ian McNabb; except where indicated 
 "Merseybeast" (6:44)
 "Affirmation" (3:33)
 "Beautiful Old Mystery" (4:10)
 "Love's Young Dream" (4:33)
 "Camaraderie" (4:17)
 "Don't Put Your Spell on Me" (5:38)
 "Heydays" (5:45)
 "Little Bit of Magic" (4:54)
 "You Stone My Soul" (6:16)
 "Too Close to the Sun" (3:47)
 "They Settled for Less Than They Wanted" (7:20)
 "I'm a Genius" (4:19)
 "Available Light" (6:20)
 "Merseybeast (reprise)" (1:51)

 North West Coast (Live bonus CD)
 "What She Did to My Mind" (7:26)
 "Evangeline" (6:29)
 "I Don't Want to Talk About It" (Danny Whitten) (6:15)
 "When It All Comes Down" (8:18)
 "Understanding Jane" (4:08)
 "Pushin' Too Hard" (Sky Saxon) (7:16)

Personnel
Ian McNabb - vocals, guitar, Moog synthesizer, piano, bass, harmonica, autoharp
Russell Milton - bass
Don Richardson - double bass
Henry Priestman - Hammond B3 organ, backing vocals
Daniel Strittmatter - drums
Preston Heyman - percussion
Andrew Findon - flute
Nick Warren - programming
Craig Leon - conductor, strings
Cassell Webb - conductor, strings
Billy Talbot - bass. backing vocals on North West Coast
Ralph Molina - drums, backing vocals on North West Coast
Nick Warren - keyboards on North West Coast
Mike Hamilton - rhythm guitar, backing vocals on North West Coast

Russell Milton and Daniel Strittmatter are "The Afterlife"

Sources

1996 albums
Ian McNabb albums
Albums recorded at Rockfield Studios